Nathan McMullen (born 13 June 1988)  is an actor, known for television roles such as Finn in Misfits and barman in Kelly + Victor.

In 2012, McMullen appeared in the fourth season of  Misfits in the regular role of Finn. McMullen plays the part of Wolf the Elf in an episode of Doctor Who.

Career 
In 2003, at the age of 15, Nathan McMullen was named "Young Comic of the Year" by Liverpool Echo during the Liverpool Comic Festival. More than 300 teenagers aged 14 to 18 competed in the contest for 12 months. For his win, Nathan got 250 pounds in pennies. He studied acting at Liverpool Community College (Now known as The City of Liverpool College) and moved on to study at the Manchester School of Theatre.

His first professional roles came in 2010, when he starred in the TV series Casualty and played Jack in Jack and the Beanstalk at the West Yorkshire Playhouse in Leeds. In 2011, he started working for the Everyman Theatre, where he starred as Witch 3 and Feance in Macbeth.

In 2015, McMullen participated in the stage adaptation of the 1994 comedy film The Hudsucker Proxy by the Coen brothers. Premier of the play was delayed because McMullen was injured during rehearsals. In 2016, McMullen was a member of the cast of the classic play by Alan Bleasdale Down the Dock Road.

Nathan McMullen continued his work for Everyman Theatre in 2018. That season he starred in the plays Paint Your Wagon (as Mike Mooney), The Big I Am (based on Peer Gynt) and A Clockwork Orange. He also works as a tutor in an acting school Act Up North, which has divisions in Manchester, Liverpool and Leeds.

Filmography

Film

Stage

References

External links
 

Living people
21st-century English male actors
Male actors from Liverpool
English male television actors
1988 births